Lindley Murray (7 June 1745 – 16 February 1826) was an American Quaker lawyer, writer and grammarian, best known for his English-language grammar books used in schools in England and the United States.

Early life
Lindley Murray was born at Harper Tavern, Pennsylvania, on 7 June 1745. His father, Robert Murray, a member of an old Quaker family, was one of the leading New York merchants. Murray was the eldest of twelve children, all of whom he survived, although he was puny and delicate in childhood. When six years old, he was sent to school in Philadelphia, but soon left to accompany his parents to North Carolina, where they lived until 1753. They then moved to New York, where Murray was sent to a good school, but proved a 'heedless boy'. Contrary to his inclinations, he was placed when only fourteen in his father's counting house. In spite of endeavors to foster in him the commercial spirit, the lad's interests were mainly concentrated in science and literature. Collecting his books, he escaped to Burlington, New Jersey, entered a boarding school, and started to study French. His retreat was discovered, he was brought back to New York, and was allowed a private tutor. His father still desired him to apply himself to commerce, but he stated arguments in favor of a literary profession so ably in writing that his father's lawyer advised him to let the lad study law.

Four years later Murray was called to the bar, and practiced as counsel and attorney in the province of New York. At the age of twenty-two he married, and in 1770 came to England, whither his father had preceded him, but Lindley returned to New York in 1771. Here his practice became both large and lucrative, in spite of his conscientious care to 'discourage litigation, and to recommend a peaceable settlement of differences.' On the outbreak of hostilities in America, Murray went with his wife to Long Island, where four years were spent in fishing, sailing, and shooting. On the declaration of independence he returned to New York, and was so successful that he retired in 1783 to a beautiful place on the Hudson.

Later life
As Murray's health was failing, he decided to try the English climate. In 1784, he left America and never returned. The remainder of his life was spent in literary pursuits at Holgate, near York. For the last sixteen years of his life, Murray's physical condition, probably the result of Post-Polio Syndrome, confined him to his house. Charles Monaghan's 1998 biography, The Murrays of Murray Hill, long considered a standard work, has been recently (2011) succeeded by Fens-de Zeeuw's authoritative work on Murray's life and language use, in which several earlier misconceptions are set straight.

His library became noted for its theological and philological treasures. He studied botany, and his garden was said to exceed in variety the Royal Gardens at Kew. The summer house in which his grammars were composed still remains. Murray's first published work, The Power of Religion on the Mind, York, 1787, 20th edition 1842, was twice translated into French. To the 8th edition (1795) was added 'Extracts from the Writings of divers Eminent Men representing the Evils of Stage Plays, &c.', published separately 1789 and 1799.

His attention was then drawn to the want of suitable lesson books for a Friends' school for girls in York, and in 1795 he published his English Grammar. The manuscript petition from the teachers requesting him to prepare it has been preserved. The work became rapidly popular; it went through nearly fifty editions, was edited, abridged, simplified, and enlarged in England and America, and for a long time was used in schools to the exclusion of all other grammar books. See History of English grammars.

In 1816, an edition corrected by the author was issued in 2 vols. 8vo. An 'Abridgment' of this version by Murray, issued two years later, went through more than 120 editions of ten thousand each. It was printed at the New England Institution for the Blind in embossed characters, Boston, 1835, and translated into Marathi, Bombay, 1837. English Exercises followed (1797), with A Key (27th edit. London, 1847), and both works were in large demand. Murray's English Reader, Sequel, and Introduction, issued respectively in 1799, 1800, and 1801 (31st edit. 1836), were equally successful, as well as the Lecteur Francais, 1802, and Introduction to the Lecteur Francais, 1807. An English Spelling Book, 1804, reached forty-four editions, and was translated into Spanish (Cadiz, 1841). Of a First Book for Children the 150th thousand, with portrait and woodcuts, was issued in 1859.

The sales of the Grammar, Exercises, Key, and Lecteur Francais brought Murray in each case £700, and he devoted the whole sum to philanthropic objects. The copyright of his religious works he presented to his publishers. By his will, a sum of money for the purchase and distribution of religious literature was vested in trustees in America. When the Retreat for the Insane was founded at York by William Tuke in 1792, Murray did his utmost to second Tuke's efforts to introduce a humane system of treatment.

He was a recorded minister of the York monthly meeting for eleven years, when his voice failed and he asked permission to resign. For the last 16 years of his life he never left the house. He died on 16 January 1826, aged 80.

Family
Murray married Hannah Dobson on 22 June 1767, who died on 25 September 1834. They had no children.

Works 
 Extracts from the Writings of Divers Eminent Authors, of Different Religious Denominations; and at Various Periods of Time, Representing the Evils and Pernicious Effects of Stage Plays, and Other Vain Amusements,  1787
 The Power of Religion on the Mind In Retirement, Sickness, and at Death; Exemplified in the Testimonies and Experience of Men Distinguished by Their Greatness, Learning, or Virtue, 1787
 English Grammar Adapted to the Different Classes of Learners. With an Appendix, Containing Rules and Observations, for Assisting the More Advanced Students to Write with Perspicuity and Accuracy. By Lindley Murray, 1795. 1824 edition
 English Exercises: Adapted to the Grammar Lately Published by L. Murray: Consisting of Exemplifications of the Parts of Speech, Instances of False Orthography, Violations of the Rules of Syntax, Defects in Punctuation, and Violations of the Rules Respecting Perspicuity and Accuracy: Designed for the Benefit of Private Learners, As Well As for the Use of Schools, 1797
 The Beauties of Prose and Verse Selected from the Most Eminent Authors, 1798
 The English Reader: or, Pieces in Prose and Poetry, Selected from the Best Writers Designed to Assist Young Persons to Read with Propriety and Effect; to Improve Their Language and Sentiments; and to Inculcate Some of the Most Important Principles of Piety and Virtue. : With a Few Preliminary Observations on the Principles of Good Reading, 1799.
 Sequel to The English Reader Or, Elegant Selections in Prose and Poetry. Designed to Improve the Highest Class of Learners in Reading; ... By Lindley Murray 1800

See also
 Robert Murray (merchant)
 Murray Hill, Manhattan
 Bryan A. Garner

References

Attribution

Sources
 
 Lyda Fens-de Zeeuw (2011). Lindley Murray (1745–1826), Quaker and Grammarian. Utrecht: Lot Dissertation Series.
 "Murray, Lindley", American Authors 1600–1900. The H. W. Wilson Company, New York, 1938
 worldcat.org Accessed June 28, 2007
 Pennsylvania Historical Markers site

External links
Murray's English Reader various formats available at the Internet Archive

1745 births
1826 deaths
English Quakers
Linguists of English
American Quakers
People from Lebanon County, Pennsylvania
People of colonial Pennsylvania